Henry Ley, 2nd Earl of Marlborough (3 December 1595 – 1 April 1638) was an English peer and Member of Parliament.

He was baptised on 3 December 1595, the eldest son of James Ley, 1st Earl of Marlborough and his wife, Mary née Petty and educated in law at Lincoln's Inn in 1610. He was called to the bar in 1616.

Ley was knighted in 1611 by James I. He was a Member (MP) of the Parliament of England for Westbury in 1614 and 1624, for Devizes in 1621 and 1626 – 2 March 1626 and for Wiltshire in 1625. He was appointed Custos Rotulorum of Somerset for life in 1625.

In 1628, he entered the House of Lords by a writ of acceleration as Baron Ley. He succeeded his father as Earl of Marlborough the following year.

Ley married Mary, daughter of Sir Arthur Capell of Hadham, by whom he had two children:
Lady Elizabeth Ley, died unmarried
James Ley, 3rd Earl of Marlborough (1618–1665)

References

|-

|-

1595 births
1638 deaths
Members of the Parliament of England (pre-1707) for Wiltshire
Members of Lincoln's Inn
English MPs 1614
English MPs 1621–1622
English MPs 1625
English MPs 1626
Earls of Marlborough